Ketoprofen is one of the propionic acid class of nonsteroidal anti-inflammatory drugs (NSAID) with analgesic and antipyretic effects. It acts by inhibiting the body's production of prostaglandin.

It was patented in 1967 and approved for medical use in 1980.

Medical uses 
Ketoprofen is generally prescribed for arthritis-related inflammatory pains or severe toothaches that result in the inflammation of the gums.

Ketoprofen topical patches are being used for treatment of musculoskeletal pain.

Ketoprofen can also be used for treatment of some pain, especially nerve pain such as sciatica, postherpetic neuralgia and referred pain for radiculopathy, in the form of a cream, ointment, liquid, spray, or gel, which may also contain ketamine and lidocaine, along with other agents which may be useful, such as cyclobenzaprine, amitriptyline, acyclovir, gabapentin, orphenadrine and other drugs used as NSAIDs or adjuvant, atypical or potentiators for pain treatment.

Trials are going on for using this drug along with ibuprofen for management of lymphedema . Animal trial and some human trials have shown significant improvement over placebo control. Dr Stanley G Rockson, of Stanford University is leading these researches.

Efficacy
A 2013 systematic review indicated "The efficacy of orally administered ketoprofen in relieving moderate-severe pain and improving functional status and general condition was significantly better than that of ibuprofen and/or diclofenac." A 2017 Cochrane systematic review investigating ketoprofen as a single-dose by mouth in acute, moderate-to-severe postoperative pain concluded that its efficacy is equivalent to drugs such as ibuprofen and diclofenac.

There is evidence supporting topical ketoprofen for osteoarthritis but not other chronic musculoskeletal pain.

Adverse effects 
In October 2020, the U.S. Food and Drug Administration (FDA) required the drug label to be updated for all nonsteroidal anti-inflammatory medications to describe the risk of kidney problems in fetuses that result in low amniotic fluid. They recommend avoiding NSAIDs in pregnant women at 20 weeks or later in pregnancy.

Mechanism
Ketoprofen undergoes metabolism in the liver via conjugation with glucuronic acid (glucuronidation) by UGT enzymes, hydroxylation of the benzoyl ring by the CYP3A4 and CYP2C9 enzymes, and reduction of its ketone moiety (a carbonyl functional group, i.e. with carbon-oxygen double bond) by carbonyl reducing enzymes (CREs).  Ketoprofen is used for its antipyretic, analgesic, and anti-inflammatory properties by inhibiting cyclooxygenase-1 and -2 (COX-1 and COX-2) enzymes reversibly, which decreases production of proinflammatory prostaglandin precursors.

The patches have been shown to provide rapid and sustained delivery to underlying tissues without significantly increasing levels of drug concentration in the blood when compared to the traditional oral administration.

Chirality and biological activity 
Ketoprofen has one stereogenic center in the side chain and hence exists as mirror-image twins. Majority of the profens are marketed as racemic mixtures.  For most of the NSAIDs the pharmacological activity reside in the (S)-enantiomers with their  (R)-enantiomer of virtually inactive. An interesting observation about most profens including ketoprofen is that they undergo unidirectional metabolic inversion, chiral inversion, of the (R)- acid to its (S)-mirror-image version with no other change in the molecule.

Available forms
Ketoprofen was available over-the-counter in the United States in the form of 12.5 mg coated tablets (Orudis KT and Actron), but this form has been discontinued. It is available by prescription capsules.

Ketoprofen is also available as a 2.5% gel for topical application, and it is also available as a patch for topical analgesia and anti-inflammatory action. However, the gel is not sold in the United States.

Brand names in Australia are Orudis and Oruvail. It is available in Japan in a transdermal patch Mohrus Tape, made by Hisamitsu Pharmaceutical.  It is available in the UK as Ketoflam and Oruvail, in Ireland as Fastum Gel, in Estonia as Keto, Ketonal, and Fastum Gel, in Finland as Ketorin, Keto, Ketomex, and Orudis; in France as Profénid, Bi-Profénid, Toprec, and Ketum; in Italy as Ketodol, Fastum Gel, Lasonil, Orudis and Oki; in Poland as Ketonal, Ketonal active, Ketolek, in Serbia, Slovenia and Croatia as Knavon and Ketonal; in Romania as Ketonal and Fastum Gel; in Mexico as Arthril; in Norway as Zon and Orudis; in Russia as ОКИ (OKI), Fastum Gel and Ketonal; in Spain as Actron and Fastum Gel; in Albania as Oki and Fastum Gel and in Venezuela as Ketoprofeno as an injectable solution of 100 mg and 150 mg capsules.

In some countries, the optically pure (S)-enantiomer (dexketoprofen) is available; its trometamol salt is said to be particularly rapidly reabsorbed from the gastrointestinal tract, having a rapid onset of effects.

The earliest report of therapeutic use in humans was in 1972.

Veterinary medicine
Ketoprofen is a common NSAID, antipyretic, and analgesic used in horses and other equines. It is most commonly used for musculoskeletal pain, joint problems, and soft tissue injury, as well as laminitis. It is also used to control fevers and prevent endotoxemia. It is also used as a mild painkiller in smaller animals, generally following surgical procedures.

In horses, it is given at a dose of 2.2 mg/kg/day. Studies have shown that it does not inhibit 5-lipoxygenase and leukotriene B4, as originally claimed. It is therefore not considered superior to phenylbutazone as previously believed, although clinical signs of lameness are reduced with its use. In fact, phenylbutazone was shown superior to ketoprofen in cases of experimentally-induced synovitis when both drugs were used at labeled dosages.

Administration
Ketoprofen, when administered intravenously, is recommended for a maximum of five days of use.  Its analgesic and antipyretic effects begin to occur one to two hours following administration.  The most common dosage is 1 mg/ lb, once per day, although this dosage may be lowered for ponies, which are most susceptible to NSAID side effects.  
It is also available as a capsule dosage form and tablet.

Ecological problems

Experiments have found ketoprofen, like diclofenac, is a veterinary drug causing lethal effects in red-headed vultures. Vultures feeding on the carcasses of recently treated livestock develop acute kidney failure within days of exposure.

References

External links 

 

Nonsteroidal anti-inflammatory drugs
Equine medications
Benzophenones
Hepatotoxins